Fillion is a surname. Notable people with the surname include:

Bob Fillion (born 1921), Canadian ice hockey player
Denis Fillion (1948–2016), Canadian curler
Emmanuel Fillion (born 1966), French-American sculptor
Gilbert Fillion (1940–2007), Canadian politician
Jeff Fillion (born 1967), Canadian radio host and businessman
Joseph-Ludger Fillion (1895–1971), Canadian politician
Marcel Fillion (1922–1998), Canadian ice hockey player
Nathan Fillion (born 1971), Canadian actor
Patrick Fillion (born 1973), Canadian illustrator and writer
Yann Fillion (born 1996), Canadian soccer player

See also
Fillon (disambiguation)